The Tualatin Mountains (also known as the West Hills or Southwest Hills of Portland) are a range on the western border of Multnomah County, Oregon, United States. A spur of the Northern Oregon Coast Range, they separate the Tualatin Basin of Washington County, Oregon, from the Portland Basin of western Multnomah County and Clark County, Washington.

Despite steep slopes, periodic landslides, and multiple earthquake faults, many residences have been built in the Tualatin Mountains, though much of the northern portion is undeveloped land within the  Forest Park. The landscape, inside and outside the park, is predominantly forested.

History
Composed mainly of basalt, the mountains were formed by several flows of the Grande Ronde basalt flows that were part of the larger Columbia River basalts. Human settlement goes back 10,000 years to the area's earliest known residents, the Chinook people.

U.S. Route 26 (the Sunset Highway) is the principal transportation link through the hills, traveling through the Vista Ridge Tunnels, Tanner Creek Canyon, and over the crest of Sylvan Hill. This route through the hills connecting the agricultural Tualatin Basin to the navigable Willamette River was developed as a plank road in the 19th century. The Great Plank Road (Canyon/Jefferson Road) was a major factor in the early growth of the city of Portland.

Since 1998, the west side MAX Light Rail has run roughly parallel to US 26 through the hills, including a section tunneled deep underground.

Radio broadcasters
The Tualatin Mountains are home to the transmitter for iHeartMedia's KLTH.

See also
List of Oregon mountain ranges
Southwest Hills, Portland, Oregon

References

Further reading
Southwest Hills Resource Protection Plan (Portland Bureau of Planning, 1992)
 A gravity study through the Tualatin Mountains, Oregon: Understanding crustal structure and earthquake hazards in the Portland urban area (R. Blakely, K. Cruikshank, A. Johnson, M. Beeson, K. Walsh, & R. Wells, 2001)
Landslides in the Portland, Oregon Metropolitan Area Resulting from the Storm of February 1996: Inventory Map, Database and Evaluation (S.F. Burns, W.J. Burns, D.H. James, & J.C. Hinkle, 1998)

Mountain ranges of Oregon
Landforms of Multnomah County, Oregon
Landforms of Washington County, Oregon
Landforms of Columbia County, Oregon